Trepalle is a village (the highest in Italy) in the Italian Alps, a frazione of Livigno, Lombardy. It is sometimes considered to be the village located at the highest altitude in Europe with its church located at an altitude of 2,069 m, and the village stretching up to the Passo d'Eira at 2,209 m. However, Kurush in southern Dagestan in Russia is situated much higher at 2480–2560 m in the northern Caucasus Mountains.

Trepalle is located above Livigno between the Foscagno Pass and the Eira Pass. The northern part of the village, by the Eira Pass, is one of the main skiing areas of Livigno.  As part of the comune of Livigno, it is also a duty-free area.

The name of this village means "three balls" in Italian, mistranslated from Trevalle, which means "three valleys". In fact, Trepalle is reachable from three different valleys: Val Trela, Val di Foscagno and Vallaccia.

The village's former priest, Don Alessandro Parenti, inspired Italian writer Giovanni Guareschi for the character of Don Camillo.

Climate 
The climate  ET Alpine Tundra is one of the coldest in Europe, with an average temperature below freezing:

See also
Extreme points of Italy

External links 

www.comune.livigno.so.it Livigno's council website
Livigno Tourist Office 

Cities and towns in Lombardy
Frazioni of the Province of Sondrio